Lindley may refer to:

Places
Australia
Lindley, South Australia, a locality
England
Lindley, Leicestershire, England
site of RAF Lindley
Lindley, North Yorkshire, England
Lindley, West Yorkshire, a suburb of Huddersfield, England
Old Lindley, West Yorkshire, England
South Africa
Lindley, Free State, a town in South Africa
Lindley, Gauteng, a sub place north of Johannesburg, South Africa
United States
 Lindley, Missouri, an unincorporated community
Lindley, New York, a town in the United States

People 
Lindley (surname)
Lindley (given name)

See also
Linley (disambiguation)